= Niren Shrestha =

Nepali Director

- निरेन श्रेष्ठ
- Born: Nepal
- Occupation: Director
- Years active: 2015-to present

Niren Shrestha (Nepali : निरेन श्रेष्ठ ) is a Nepali music and movie director from Kathmandu Nepal. He directs Nepali music videos and movies.

Director Niren Shrestha started his career with debut song "Marka Marka Kammara" in the year 2062 BS (2005 AD). Until today, he has directed more than three hundred videos in various genres like Dohori, Pop, Modern, Folk, and Bhajan. Niran, who has over 10 years of experience in this field, has worked on different geners. "Laagchha Timrai Aakha," "Nachhodnu Haat," "Timile Ra Ghamlagla-Dui",""sundar Dolakha" are some of his popular songs. He was awarded from Nepal music & fashion awards and Epic Nepal Music Award.

== Awards ==
SN	Award name	Awards category	Song name	Ref
1	Nepal Music and Fashion Award - 2022	Best Director (FOLK DUET)	Barko Hago	
2	3rd Natyashwor Music Award - 2023	Best Derector (LOK DOHORI)	Noau Dadha Mathi	
3	4 Epic Music Nepal Music Award	Best Director (LOK DOHORI SONG)	Gamala Ma Jai	
4	Samabesi Music Awards	-	-	

== Music video ==
SN	Name	Release date	Vocal	Cast	Credit	ref
1	Kasto Maya Jal	2021	Kamal Chapagain/Rina KC	Sukra Lama/Arati Magar	Director	
2	He Maya	2021	Resham Thapa/Parbati Baniya	Bhauwan Chaulagain	Director	
3	Gaajalu	2021	Dashrath Dongol/ Binda Sundas	Prakash Tamang Raj/ Annu Parajuli	Director	
4	Sundar Dolakha	2023	Ashim Kumar Katuwal/Pratima Aryal/ Pradip Pariyar	Kumar Sunel/ Juna Karki/Kabita Mahat	Director	
5	Man ma pir	2023	Samikshya Adhikari /Prakash Puri.Ramkumar Nepali	Sarad LG. /Asmita Ranapal /Rajan Puri	Director	
6	Mera Aama Baba	2023	Anju Panta	Surbir Pandit/Rasmi Bhatt/Roshani Karki	Director	
7	Ghopti	2022	Ashim Kumar Katuwal /Amrita Rayamajhi	Zimbey Rai /Apsara Karki	Director	
8	Gamala Ma Jai	2022	Pratap Das /Manisha Ghorasaini	Pratap Das /Manisha Ghorasaini	Director	
9	Barko Hago	2021	Saroj Lamichhane, Smriti Gautam, Simi Thakuri, Bishnu Kale Thakur	Sanjib Thakuri /Aayushma Karki	Director	
10	Nau Dada Mathi	2022	SagarBirahi /Kalika Roka Magar	Anju Gurung/Shekhar Gharti Magar	Director	
11	Badhai Chha	2023			Director	
12	Hami Desh Bachau	2021	Ajaya Karki		Director	
13	Baini Ho	2023	Kiran Gautam/Manisha Gharasaini		Director	
